Taylor–von Neumann–Sedov blast wave (or sometimes referred to as Sedov–von Neumann–Taylor blast wave) refers to a blast wave induced by a strong explosion. The blast wave was described by a self-similar solution independently by G. I. Taylor, John von Neumann and Leonid Sedov during World War II.

History
G. I. Taylor was told by the British Ministry of Home Security that it might be possible to produce a bomb in which a very large amount of energy would be released by nuclear fission and asked to report the effect of such weapons. Taylor presented his results on June 27, 1941. Exactly at the same time, in the United States, John von Neumann was working on the same problem and he presented his results on June 30, 1941. It was said that Leonid Sedov was also working on the problem around the same time in the USSR, although Sedov never confirmed any exact dates.

Taylor got clearance to publish his results in 1949 and he published his works in two papers in 1950. In the second paper, Taylor calculated the energy of the atomic bomb used in the Trinity (nuclear test) using the similarity, just by looking at the series of blast wave photographs that had a length scale and time stamps, published by Julian E Mack in 1947. This calculation of energy caused, in Taylor's own words, 'much embarrassment' (according to Grigory Barenblatt) in US government circles since the number was then still classified although the photographs published by Mack were not. Taylor's biographer George Batchelor writes This estimate of the yield of the first atom bomb explosion caused quite a stir... G.I. was mildly admonished by the US Army for publishing his deductions from their (unclassified) photographs.

Mathematical description
Consider a strong explosion (such as nuclear bombs) that releases a large amount of energy  in a small volume during a short time interval. This will create a strong spherical shock wave propagating outwards from the explosion center. The self-similar solution tries to describe the flow when the shock wave has moved through a distance that is extremely large when compared to the size of the explosive. At these large distances, the information about the size and duration of the explosion will be forgotten; only the energy released  will have influence on how the shock wave evolves. To a very high degree of accuracy, then it can be assumed that the explosion occurred at a point (say the origin ) instantaneously at time .

The shock wave in the self-similar region is assumed to be still very strong such that the pressure behind the shock wave  is very large in comparison with the pressure (atmospheric pressure) in front of the shock wave , which can be neglected from the analysis. Although the pressure of the undisturbed gas is negligible, the density of the undisturbed gas  cannot be neglected since the density jump across strong shock waves is finite as a direct consequence of Rankine–Hugoniot conditions. This approximation is equivalent to setting  and the corresponding sound speed , but keeping its density non zero, i.e., .

The only parameters available at our disposal are the energy  and the undisturbed gas density .

.

This means that the shock wave location  itself will correspond to a particular value, say , of this variable, i.e.,

The propagation velocity of the shock wave is

where  is the specific heat ratio.

Self-similar solution
The gas motion behind the shock wave is governed by Euler equations. For an ideal polytropic gas with spherical symmetry, the equations for the fluid variables such as radial velocity , density  and pressure  are given by

At , the solutions should approach the values given by the Rankine-Hugoniot conditions defined in the previous section.

The variable pressure can be replaced by the sound speed  since pressure can be obtained from the formula . The following non-dimensional self-similar variables are introduced,

.

The conditions at the shock front  becomes

Substituting the self-similar variables into the governing equations will lead to three ordinary differential equations. Solving these differential equations analytically is laborious, as shown by Sedov in 1946 and von Neumann in 1947. G. I. Taylor integrated these equations numerically to obtain desired results.

Due to self-similarity, it is clear that not only the total energy within a sphere of radius  is constant, but also the total energy within a sphere of any radius  (in dimensional form, it says that total energy within a sphere of radius  that moves outwards with a velocity  must be constant). Equating these expressions and substituting  and  that is valid for ideal polytropic gas leads to

The continuity and energy equation reduce to

where

The constant  that determines the shock location can be determined from the conservation of energy

to obtain

Asymptotic behavior near the central region
The asymptotic behavior of the central region can be investigated by taking the limit . From the figure, it can be observed that the density falls to zero very rapidly behind the shock wave. The entire mass of the gas which was initially spread out uniformly in a sphere of radius  is now contained in a thin layer behind the shock wave, that is to say, all the mass is driven outwards by the acceleration imparted by the shock wave. Thus, most of the region is basically empty. The pressure ratio also drops rapidly to attain the constant value . The temperature ratio follows from the ideal gas law; since density ratio decays to zero and the pressure ratio is constant, the temperature ratio must become infinite. The limiting form for the density is given as follows

Remember that the density  is time-independent whereas  which means that the actual pressure is in fact time dependent. It becomes clear if the above forms are rewritten in dimensional units,

The velocity ratio has the linear behavior in the central region,

whereas the behavior of the velocity itself is given by

Final stage of the blast wave
As the shock wave evolves in time, its strength decreases. At this later stage of the evolution,  (and consequently ) cannot be neglected. This means that the evolution is not self-similar, because one can form a length scale  and a time scale  to describe the problem. The governing equations are then integrated numerically, as was done by H. Goldstine and John von Neumann, Brode, and Okhotsimskii et al.

Cylindrical line explosion
The analogous problem in cylindrical geometry corresponding to an axisymmetric blast wave can be solved analytically. This problem was solved independently by Leonid Sedov, A. Sakurai and S. C. Lin.

See also
Guderley–Landau–Stanyukovich problem
Zeldovich–Taylor flow

References

Fluid dynamics
Equations of fluid dynamics